Richland Farm may refer to:

Richland Farm (Stanford, Kentucky), listed on the National Register of Historic Places listings in Lincoln County, Kentucky
Richland Farm (Clarksville, Maryland), listed on the National Register of Historic Places in Howard County, Maryland